Football Manager Live was a massively multiplayer online game (MMO) developed by Sports Interactive released in November 2008 for Microsoft Windows and Mac OS X.

Whilst the game was subscription based, both major and minor updates were provided within the subscription paid by users. Subscriptions could be purchased online using debit/credit cards, or PayPal to play on a regular basis, or through boxed copies, which were released in the United Kingdom on 23 January 2009. The servers for the game shut down in May 2011.

Gameplay
Football Manager Live differed significantly from previous Football Manager titles, whilst keeping the same match engine and many of their fundamental concepts.

Users were assigned to a "Game World" of up to 1000 players and created their club and filled their squad with real players, similar to fantasy football. Players were signed via a proxy bidding system similar to that of eBay with the player signing with the highest-bidding club. Whilst Football Manager Live utilised a very similar database to that of Football Manager 2009, like its offline counterpart, ageing players retired and younger players were randomly generated in their place within each game world, creating an increasingly fictional environment as seasons progress.

Clubs could choose a football association based on the number of matches the user wants to play ("Casual" FAs for casual players and "Xtreme" ones for more dedicated managers) and which play times were most convenient. Each FA had its own ladder system with a premier league and several lower leagues which were linked via promotion and relegation. Matchmaking for league fixtures was done through a "resolve by" system in which users have to finish a game by a certain deadline instead of having to meet online at a specific time. If a player could not meet the deadline, an AI "assistant manager" took over their team for that match.

The game also added a role playing game-like skill training system for users. Managers could improve their skills over time in coaching, physiotherapy, finance, scouting and infrastructure to become more specialised or to suit their style of play.

In order to manage the inflationary economics of the game, players were required to construct a stadium to accommodate several different fan bases to the club. These included die hards, devoted, families, glory hunters and corporates, each offering their own characteristics such as wealth and atmosphere. This took money out of club finances and was generally received negatively by players. The stadia and fan base profile had little impact on gameplay and had no impact on the appearance of stadia during gameplay.

Gameworlds 
There were 12 Gameworlds in Football Manager Live.  The gameworld system was radically changed in 2010 when they were split into two types: 'Fantasy Players' and 'Returning Stars.'  Previously, as a gameworld progressed over time, 'real life' players gradually aged and retired to be replaced by generated players (or 'regens').  This remains the case with 'Fantasy Players' gameworlds, but for 'Returning Stars' the gameworld is reset sporadically back to the present day.

The first gameworld, launched on 4 November 2008 was Cantona, and this was followed by 8 other worlds until the first Pro-Gameworld, Toms, was launched on 12 January 2009. Existing users were encouraged to join the first Pro-Gameworld by having the opportunity to transfer the skills that they had gained to the new Gameworld. This had not been possible when transferring worlds previously and the challenge of playing the best was readily taken up.

Gameworlds were named after real-life ex-players.

In June 2010 the 3D match engine, first seen in Football Manager 2009 was added to Football Manager Live.

Game restructuring

On 26 November 2009, vast changes to the existing game were announced by SI. The most controversial of these changes was the announcement of the resetting of all current game worlds to their initial states, which would commence on 1 March 2010 This announcement caused controversy amongst the community as many managers were upset by the results from this decision which would include losing all progress made up until this date. SI in an attempt to make up for this action offered all current subscribers two months of free play time though this was met with relatively negative reactions.

On 18 December 2009 Sports Interactive announced that it would be extending the free time for its managers until the reset in March 2010. It was also announced following the outcry over lost skills that they would be implementing a new skills system into FML after the reset which would allow current managers to use their existing skill points after the reset. This move was met with great appreciation by the game's current subscribers. At the same time it was announced that the new version 1.4 would include youth academies and many more extras which its subscribers had been asking for many months.

References

External links
 Official site
 Football Manager Live FAQ

2008 video games
Inactive massively multiplayer online games
Live
Massively multiplayer online role-playing games
Video games developed in the United Kingdom
Windows games
MacOS games
Products and services discontinued in 2011